Christopher McCart (born 17 April 1967 in Baillieston) is a Scottish former footballer who played as a defender.

Playing career
McCart started his career at Motherwell where he was voted player of the year in 1991. McCart spent the next twelve seasons with the Fir Park before a short spell with Falkirk. In 1990–91, McCart was part of Motherwell's Scottish Cup-winning side, while also winning the Scottish Challenge Cup with Falkirk in 1997–98.

Coaching career
After retiring from playing, McCart held a youth coaching role at former club Motherwell before joining Celtic as head of youth development in June 2008 following the death of Tommy Burns. Liverpool and Scotland full back Andy Robertson later stated in 2017 that McCart emphasised a more physical approach than had previously been the case at Celtic, and that this was instrumental in him (Robertson) being released from the club as a 15-year-old. Future internationals Declan Gallagher, Stuart Findlay, Jackson Irvine and Stephen O'Donnell also left Celtic before achieving better results elsewhere, but McCart played a role in the development of the likes of James Forrest, Callum McGregor and Kieran Tierney into top level players.

On 11 September 2008, McCart played for a Motherwell side in Dougie Arnott's belated testimonial match against an Old Firm select.

Personal life
His son Jamie McCart is also a footballer and a defender, who began his career as an academy player at Celtic.

Honours

Club
Motherwell
Scottish Cup: 1990–91
Falkirk
Scottish Challenge Cup: 1997–98

References

External links
 
 
 

1967 births
Living people
Sportspeople from Lanark
People from Baillieston
Association football defenders
Scottish footballers
Scotland B international footballers
Scottish Football League players
Motherwell F.C. players
Falkirk F.C. players
Celtic F.C. non-playing staff
Motherwell F.C. non-playing staff
Footballers from South Lanarkshire